Mahesh Kanodia (27 January 1937 – 25 October 2020) was a singer and a politician from Gujarat state in India.

Biography 
Mahesh Kanodia was born on 27 January 1937, at Kanoda village (now in Patan district, Gujarat), India. He completed his primary education from Shahpur School in Ahmedabad. He worked in Gujarati cinema for four decades as a musician, singer and composer. He performed with his actor-singer brother Naresh Kanodia.

He represented the Patan constituency in Lok Sabha four times (10th, 11th, 12th and 14th) as a member of the Bharatiya Janata Party, 1991–1999, and 2004–2009.

Sauna Hridayma Hammesh: Mahesh-Naresh, an autobiographical Gujarati book on brothers was published in 2011.

He died on 25 October 2020, in Gandhinagar from COVID-19 during the COVID-19 pandemic in India. He had paralysis for six years before his death.
His younger brother Naresh Kanodia died two days later, also from Covid.

Awards
Mahesh Kanodia received the following details among the awards given by Gujarat Government to Gujarati film artists.
 Award for Best Music for the film Jigar and Ami (1970–71) (as a composer)
 Award for Best Music for the film Tanariri (1974–75) (as a composer)
 Award for the second best film for the film Jog Sanjog (1980/81) (as a producer)
 Award for the best music for the film Jog Sanjog (1980/81) (as a composer)
 Award for Best Playback Singer for the film Akhand Chudlo (1981/82)
 Award for the best music for the film Laju Lakhan (1991/92) (as a composer)

Personal life
He married Uma on 1 January 1960. Their daughter Pooja, a singer, died in 2015. His nephew Hitu Kanodia is an MLA in Gujarat assembly.

References

 https://news4gujarati.com/famous-gujarat-singer-mahesh-kanodia-passes-away-news4-gujarati/

People from Gujarat
Bharatiya Janata Party politicians from Gujarat
1939 births
2020 deaths
India MPs 2004–2009
Indian actor-politicians
People from Mehsana district
People from Patan district
India MPs 1991–1996
India MPs 1996–1997
India MPs 1998–1999
Lok Sabha members from Gujarat
Kanodia family
Deaths from the COVID-19 pandemic in India